The 1983 Troy State Trojans football team represented Troy State University (now known as Troy University) as a member of the Gulf South Conference (GSC) during the 1983 NCAA Division II football season. Led by first-year head coach Chan Gailey, the Trojans compiled an overall record of 7–4, with a mark of 4–3 in conference play, and finished tied for second in the GSC.

Schedule

References

Troy State
Troy Trojans football seasons
Troy State Trojans football